A list of films produced by the Tollywood (Bengali language film industry) based in Kolkata in the year 1979.

A-Z of films

References

External links

1979
Lists of 1979 films by country or language
Films, Bengali